In Korean mythology and history, Asadal was the capital city of the kingdom of Gojoseon (meaning "Older Joseon"), the first Korean kingdom and notably founded by the legendary god-king Dangun. It is thought that Asadal was located in Manchuria, or in the northeastern Hwanghae Province in North Korea, or in the Pyongyang Province (hanja , with no relation to the modern-day capital of North Korea).

Etymology 
The etymology of "Asadal" is uncertain. One hypothesis is that the word  is a compound composed of two elements, asa + dal; this hypothesis is primarily motivated by an assumption of equivalence between the Chinese phonetic transcription  Asīdá and the word  Joseon (Cháoxiǎn or Cháoxiān, in Chinese), another name for Korea. However, the etymology of  Joseon is ultimately unknown, with opinions differing as to whether the word was created as a phonetic transcription or as a semantic calque (presumably of a foreign word). Furthermore, the reading of the Mandarin Chinese character  (cháo) is identical to the reading when used to mean "dynasty," not with the reading when used to mean "morning" (which would instead be zhāo).

In this case, Asadal would mean "Morning Land." If, however, the final syllable was used much like the Goryeo city-name suffix -dal (used for mountains or cities founded on plateaus/mountains), then Asadal would mean "Morning Mountain."

History 
The first Korean historical work that mention Asadal is the Samguk Yusa ( - "Memorabilia of the Three Kingdoms"), which cites the Chinese Book of Wei (Korean Hangul/ Hanja: / - wi-seo). The Samguk Yusa also cites the lost historical records of Go-gi ( - "Old Analects/ Records") to the effect that Dangun's capital was located in Pyongyang. But recent studies show that there were more than one city named Pyongyang (which literally means "flat soil" in Chinese), situated in the north deep in Manchuria - possibly bordering in between China and Russia. The modern Pyongyang, capital of North Korea, is actually the southern counterpart. At that time it was common for an emperor to manage two capitals and rule in two palaces. Therefore, it could be that the "true" Asadal is located in Manchuria.

See also

 Wanggeom-seong, a capital of later Gojoseon

Other sources
 Lee, Peter H & Wm. Theodore De Bary. Sources of Korean Tradition, page 5-6. Columbia University Press, 1997.

References

External links
 Naver Encyclopedia 

Gojoseon
Former capitals of Korea
Dangun